Libyan Institute for Advanced Studies (مجمع ليبيا للدراسات المتقدمة) or (LIAS) is a private research, advisory, and education institution in Libya. It has campuses in Tripoli, Bayda, and Tobruk.

LIAS is led by Chairman Dr. Aref Ali Nayed.

References

Educational organizations based in Libya